Doug Flament is an American politician currently serving in the Montana House of Representatives from Montana's 29th district. He was appointed to the seat after incumbent Republican Dan Bartel was appointed to the Montana Senate. He was selected to replace Bartel and was sworn in on December 14, 2021.

References

Republican Party members of the Montana House of Representatives
21st-century American politicians
Living people
Year of birth missing (living people)